Kill! Kill! Kill! Kill! is a 1971 film written and directed by Romain Gary.

Cast
 Stephen Boyd as Brad Killian
 Jean Seberg as Emily Hamilton
 James Mason as Alan Hamilton
 Curd Jürgens as Grueningen 
 Daniel Emilfork as Mejid

Reception
Kevin Thomas of the Los Angeles Times called it "totally ludicrous".

References

External links
 

1971 films
1970s thriller films
French thriller films
German thriller films
Italian thriller films
Spanish thriller films
West German films
English-language French films
English-language German films
English-language Italian films
English-language Spanish films
Films based on works by Romain Gary
Films about the illegal drug trade
1970s Italian films
1970s French films
1970s German films